The Antonin Scalia Law School (previously George Mason University School of Law) is the law school of George Mason University, a public research university in Virginia.

U.S. News & World Report ranks the school 30th among American law schools, 12th among public schools, and third in the Washington metropolitan area, behind Georgetown University Law Center and George Washington University Law School. In 2021, the school had 604 students in its J.D., JD/MBA, and JD/MPP programs and 187 students in its LL.M. and J.M. programs. The median LSAT score among incoming J.D. students in 2022 was 166, and the median GPA was 3.83. The passage rate for first-time takers of the Virginia bar exam in July 2021 was 92%, second among Virginia's eight law schools.

History
George Mason University School of Law was authorized by the Virginia General Assembly in March 1979 and was founded on July 1, 1979. The school started as the International School of Law (ISL), which opened in 1972 in a classroom at the Federal Bar Building on Pennsylvania Avenue in Washington, DC. In 1973, it moved into the home of former United States Chief Justice Edward Douglass White on Rhode Island Avenue, and in 1975 purchased the old Kann's Department Store in Arlington. Despite the growth, ISL could never obtain accreditation. In 1976, it discussed a merger with George Mason University, which expressed interest in setting up a law school. In 1978, the Virginia State Council of Education denied GMU's proposal to start a law school and encouraged a merger with ISL instead. Later that year, the Council advised against allowing that merger, but the Virginia state legislature nonetheless approved the merger in early March 1979.

The school became fully accredited by the American Bar Association in 1986, but was still not widely known during the late 1980s. Since then, however, its rankings have risen rapidly, from 45th in 2020 to 30th in 2023.

In 2016, the school received $30 million to rename itself for Antonin Scalia, the late United States Supreme Court justice. The Charles Koch Foundation provided $10 million of the donation, with the remaining $20 million coming from an anonymous donor. On March 31, Mason's Board of Visitors approved the renaming. School officials soon announced a new name: Antonin Scalia Law School, a decision ratified by the State Council of Higher Education for Virginia on May 17. In 2022, ProPublica reported that the anonymous donor was Barre Seid, a businessman and philanthropist known for his donations to conservative causes.

Rankings
U.S. News & World Report ranks the Antonin Scalia Law School 30th in the United States.

Tuition
The total cost of attendance (tuition, fees, and living expenses) for the 2022–23 academic year at Mason Law is $54,819 for in-state students attending full-time; the total cost of attendance for non-resident students attending full-time is $70,667.

Journals

Student-edited
 George Mason Law Review()
 George Mason Civil Rights Law Journal
 George Mason International Law Journal 
 National Security Law Journal 
 The Journal of Law, Economics & Policy

Other
 Supreme Court Economic Review, published by University of Chicago Press in conjunction with the Law and Economics Center at the George Mason University School of Law

Law library
The George Mason Law Library has a collection of electronic and print materials providing access to legal treatises, journals, and databases. Non-legal materials are available through the GMU University Libraries. It is a selective depository for U.S. Government documents, and it provides inter-library lending services with other academic libraries, which enables students and faculty to borrow materials from major academic libraries. The library occupies four levels of the law school building. It has 14 study rooms, 70 carrel seats, and 196 table seats wired with electrical and network connections, and a wireless network is available. The library also operates two computer labs with a variety of software. The library employs 16 full-time staff members, including 6 librarians with degrees in law and library science and 3 technology specialists. Access is limited to university faculty, students, staff, alumni and members of the bar.

Academic and student climate
Antonin Scalia Law School has a reputation for tilting towards conservative principles, a perception that increased with the renaming in 2016 for the originalist Scalia. The donation was conditioned on a requirement that the donor be notified of any change in the law school's leadership. In 2019, the law school received a gift of $50 million, the largest ever received by the university, from the estate of Allison and Dorothy Rouse to "fund a chair or chairs that will promote the conservative principles of governance, statesmanship, high morals, civil and religious freedom and the study of the United States Constitution".

National Security Institute 
The law school is also home to the National Security Institute, a think tank dedicated to research in national security, especially legal issues pertaining to national security.

Global Antitrust Institute 
Antonin Scalia Law School also houses the Global Antitrust Institute (GAI), a think tank mainly concerned with antitrust and competition policy. In 2021, Bloomberg reported on the "revolving door" between members of the GAI's faculty who later held positions at the Federal Trade Commission, a government agency tasked with regulating many of the companies that make significant donations to the GAI and the law school at large.

Notable people

Alumni
 Jonathan H. Adler, American legal commentator and law professor at the Case Western Reserve University School of Law
 John Bartrum, American lawyer and colonel in the United States Air Force Reserve
 Robert Bixby, Executive Director of the Concord Coalition
 Martha Boneta, American policy advisor, commentator, and farmer known for her role in the passage of a landmark right-to-farm law in Virginia
 Anna Escobedo Cabral, Treasurer of the United States under President George W. Bush
 Michael F. Cannon, director of health policy studies at the Cato Institute
 James W. Carroll,  director of the Office of National Drug Control Policy under President Donald Trump
 Kathleen L. Casey, Commissioner of the U.S. Securities and Exchange Commission
 Rabia Chaudry, Pakistani-American attorney, author, and podcast host; founder and president of the Safe Nation Collaborative
 John Critzos II, American martial arts fighter and instructor teaching martial arts at the United States Naval Academy and personal injury lawyer
 Katherine A. Crytzer, United States District Judge of the United States District Court for the Eastern District of Tennessee
 Ken Cuccinelli, Acting United States Deputy Secretary of Homeland Security, 46th Attorney General of Virginia, a former member of the Virginia Senate from the 37th district
 William W. Eldridge IV, American General District Court Judge for the 26th Judicial District of Virginia
 David Jolly, a former member of the U.S. House of Representatives
 Colleen Kiko, chairman of the United States Federal Labor Relations Authority under Presidents Donald Trump and Joe Biden
 Chris Krebs, director of the Cybersecurity and Infrastructure Security Agency under President Donald Trump
 Robert A. Levy, chairman of the Cato Institute and director of the Institute of Justice
 Melissa A. Long, Associate Justice of the Rhode Island Supreme Court
 William W. Mercer, United States Associate Attorney General under President George W. Bush and member of the Montana House of Representatives
 Kendrick Moxon, lead counsel for the Church of Scientology
 Paul F. Nichols, former delegate to the Virginia General Assembly
 Liam O'Grady, judge of the U.S. District Court for the Eastern District of Virginia
 Maureen Ohlhausen, former commissioner of the U.S. Federal Trade Commission
 Paul S. Phillips, a mystery novelist who writes under the pen name of James Chandler
 Scott Pinsker, American filmmaker, talk-show host, author, and celebrity publicist
 David J. Porter, judge of the U.S. Court of Appeals for the Third Circuit
 Steve Ricchetti, counselor to the president under President Joe Biden
 Wesley G. Russell Jr., Justice of the Supreme Court of Virginia
 Harlan M. Sands, 7th President of Cleveland State University
 Charles Stimson, Deputy Assistant Secretary of Defense for Detainee Affairs under President George W. Bush
 Glen Sturtevant, member of the Senate of Virginia from 2016-2020
 Mary Kirtley Waters, Director of the United Nations Information Centre
 John Whitbeck, chairman of the Republican Party of Virginia from 2015-2018
 Mark Willis, American businessman, politician, and former United States Army counterintelligence agent
 Richard L. Young, judge of the U.S. District Court for the Southern District of Indiana

Faculty
 David Bernstein, University Professor, constitutional law scholar, and legal blogger at The Volokh Conspiracy
 Francis H. Buckley, George Mason University Foundation Professor of Law
 Henry N. Butler, Henry G. Manne Chair in Law and Economics, director of Law & Economics Center and former dean
 Ernest W. DuBester, member of the Federal Labor Relations Authority
 Douglas H. Ginsburg, Senior Judge, U.S. Court of Appeals for the District of Columbia Circuit and former U.S. Supreme Court nominee
 Neil Gorsuch, Associate Justice, United States Supreme Court
 Timothy J. Muris, George Mason University Foundation Professor of Law, former chairman of the Federal Trade Commission (FTC)
 Joshua D. Wright, University Professor, executive director of the Global Antitrust Institute, former FTC commissioner
 Todd J. Zywicki, George Mason University Foundation Professor of Law

References

External links
 Antonin Scalia Law School, George Mason University

Educational institutions established in 1972
Educational institutions established in 1979
George Mason University
Law schools in Virginia
Education in Arlington County, Virginia
1972 establishments in Virginia
1979 establishments in Virginia